This was the fourth European Championship and was won by Wales for the third time in a row. The tri-nation tournament was played between January and April 1938 as single round robin games between England, France and Wales.

Results

England vs Wales

France vs England

Wales vs France

Final standings

References

European Nations Cup
European rugby league championship
International rugby league competitions hosted by the United Kingdom
International rugby league competitions hosted by France